The 1961 World Judo Championships were the 3rd edition of the Men's World Judo Championships, and were held in Paris, France on 2 December 1961. The 1961 tournament was notable for Anton Geesink for being the first non-Japanese judoka to win gold at the World Judo Championship.

Medal overview

Men

Medal table

References

External links
 

 Video footage of the 1961 World Judo Championship retrieved December 15, 2013

World Championships
Judo in France
J
World Judo Championships
World
J